Willie McCall (14 November 1920 – 1 June 1985) was a Scottish footballer. He played for Hamilton Academical, Aberdeen, Newcastle United, Motherwell, Third Lanark, Worcester City and Arbroath. McCall appeared for Aberdeen in the Scottish Cup Final and the Scottish League Cup Final during the 1946–47 season.

External links 

1920 births
1985 deaths
Footballers from Glasgow
Scottish footballers
Association football wingers
Hamilton Academical F.C. players
Aberdeen F.C. players
Newcastle United F.C. players
Motherwell F.C. players
Third Lanark A.C. players
Worcester City F.C. players
Arbroath F.C. players
Scottish Football League players
English Football League players